Doore Doore Oru Koodu Koottam is a 1986 Indian Malayalam-language satirical comedy drama film directed by Sibi Malayil, written by Sreenivasan and produced by M. Mani. It stars Mohanlal, Menaka, Jagathy Sreekumar, Nedumudi Venu, Mamukkoya, Sukumari, Kunjandi, Sreenivasan, Sanath Mathur Innocent and K. P. A. C. Sunny in major roles. The film won the National Film Award for Best Film on Other Social Issues.

Plot

The film is a socio-centric story of the education system that existed in the period 1980s to 1990s in Kerala. Divakaran, in search of a good job acquires fake certificates from Mysore TTC and becomes a teacher in a government-aided lower primary school run by a corrupt manager. The thatched school is deplorable in every condition. Children mainly come for the food that is served. The teachers come mainly for the money and do not care about the kids or the school facilities.

The corrupt manager runs the school as a business for getting grants and making money from appointments. In the climax, the hero realizes his mistake from guilt which was seeded by his father and took form when the dilapidated school causes the death of 3 students. In the turn of events, Divakaran surrenders to the police for using a fake teaching certificate.

Cast

 Mohanlal as Divakaran
 Menaka as Sujatha
 Jagathy Sreekumar as Nanu Mash
 Nedumudi Venu as Kunjan Nair, Head master
 Mamukkoya as Koya, teacher
 Sukumari as teacher
 Kunjandi as Govindankutty Mash, Divakaran's father
 Sreenivasan as Vijayan Mash
 Innocent as MLA
 K.P.A.C. Sunny as Nambiar (School manager)
 Kozhikode Santha Devi as Divakaran's mother
 Paravoor Bharathan as Karyasthan
 Jagannatha Varma as AEO
 Kiran G. Nath
 Thodupuzha Vasanthi as Nambiar's wife

Soundtrack

References

External links
 

1980s Malayalam-language films
Indian comedy films
Films directed by Sibi Malayil
Best Film on Other Social Issues National Film Award winners